Madhuri Dixit is an Indian actress, film producer, television personality, musical artist and dancer known for her works in Hindi films. She made her acting debut in 1984 with Abodh where she portrayed a young bride. Dixit went on to appear in several films over the next three years, including the dramas Awara Baap (1985) and Swati (1986), though none of them garnered her much recognition. The role of Mohini in N. Chandra's action romance drama  Tezaab (1988) proved to be a breakthrough for Dixit. The film went on to become the highest-grossing film of that year. For her performance, Dixit received a Best Actress nomination at Filmfare. She achieved further success by featuring as the female lead in several top-grossing action-dramas, including Ram Lakhan (1989),  Tridev (1989), and Kishen Kanhaiya (1990). The role of a wealthy brat in the 1990 romantic drama Dil earned Dixit her first Filmfare Award for Best Actress. The following year, she starred in another box-office hit Saajan, and won a second Best Actress award at Filmfare for portraying the role of a strong woman who rebels against her manipulative mother-in-law in the 1992 drama Beta.

She featured alongside Jackie Shroff and Sanjay Dutt in the action thriller Khalnayak (1993), one of the highest-grossing films of that year. Subsequently, she played an avenger in the drama Anjaam (1994) to positive reviews. Dixit's subsequent release was Sooraj Barjatya's Hum Aapke Hain Koun..! (1994), a family drama which emerged as the highest-grossing Bollywood film to that point. The following year, she featured in  Raja (1995) which was a blockbuster film of that year and Yaraana in which she played a woman who attempts an escape from her abusive husband. Both of her releases in 1996—Rajkumar and Prem Granth—were financial failures. Dixit's portrayal of a headstrong dancer in Yash Chopra's 1997 romance Dil To Pagal Hai was a major success, earning her a fourth Filmfare Award for Best Actress. She garnered critical acclaim for her work in the dramas Mrityudand (1997), Wajood (1998) and Pukar (2000). She portrayed five roles in the experimental film Gaja Gamini (2000).

Dixit was praised for her supporting role as a woman fighting against gender discrimination in Lajja (2001), a drama on women's rights, which performed poorly at the box-office. The year 2002 saw Dixit starring in two romantic dramas, including Devdas opposite Shah Rukh Khan, in which she played the role of Chandramukhi, a courtesan in love with an alcoholic. For the film, she won a Filmfare Award in the Best Supporting Actress category. After a five-year absence from the screen, Dixit played a leading role in Anil Mehta's dance film Aaja Nachle (2007). Despite the film's failure at the box-office, her performance was praised.  The widely praised role of a con woman Begum Para in Abhishek Chaubey's black comedy film Dedh Ishqiya (2014) marked her first acting role in seven years,  she received her 14th Best Actress nomination at Filmfare for it. She followed it by playing the leader of a vigilante group in the action crime drama film  Gulaab Gang. Her highest-grossing release came with the adventure comedy Total Dhamaal (2019), which ranks among the highest-grossing Indian films of all time. On television, Dixit has served as a talent judge for the dance reality shows Jhalak Dikhhla Jaa (2010–2014, 2022) and Dance Deewane (2018–2021).

Films

Television

Web series

See also
 List of awards and nominations received by Madhuri Dixit

Notes

References

External links
 

Indian filmographies
Actress filmographies